Kalyani Stadium is a stadium in Kalyani, West Bengal, India. The stadium holds 20,000 spectators. Currently the stadium is being re-modelled with full-fledged modern structure and 5 storied gallery with added facilities. It now hosts matches of I-League and Calcutta Football League.

About

It is the home stadium of Mohun Bagan A.C., East Bengal F.C of the I-League. It has emerged as an alternative location to Kolkata for holding numerous I-League, Calcutta Football League football matches and other sporting events. Kalyani Stadium hosts national and international level football matches.

The Kolkata-based clubs like Mohun Bagan, East Bengal FC and Mohammedan S.C. use Kalyani Stadium as their home ground in some national level matches.

A swimming pool and well-equipped gymnasium are attached with the said Stadium. The stadium also has floodlights to support night matches.

Presently the stadium has been re-modelled with full-fledged modern structure and 5 storied gallery with added facilities.

Position
Kalyani Stadium situated near the Kalyani Lake and almost in the middle portion of Kalyani city. The main gate of it is just opposite of the Kalyani Sub Divisional Court Building. A swimming pool and gymnasium are attached with the Stadium.

Transportation 

10 minutes away from Kalyani railway station and 5 minutes away from Kalyani Silpanchal railway station from the stadium.

There are numerous autos, totos and buses are available.

Football matches

The Kalyani Stadium hosts the home games of the local clubs Mohun Bagan AC and SC East Bengal  in the Calcutta Football League. It also hosts the games of Mohammedan Sporting, that currently competes in the I-League.

The stadium has also hosted domestic association football tournaments like the Durand Cup in 2019, 
IFA Shield, 
Santosh Trophy, 
2019 SAFF U-15 Championship, 
Calcutta Football League, 
U-17 Women's Championship in 2019 and many others Indian and international tournaments.

References

External links

Football venues in West Bengal
Sports venues in Kolkata
Kalyani, West Bengal
Year of establishment missing